Oregon City School District may refer to:

Oregon City School District (Ohio)
Oregon City School District (Oregon)